Camaridium vestitum, called purple tiger orchid, is a species of epiphytic orchids native to Florida, the West Indies and through Latin America from  Mexico to Bolivia.

Camaridium vestitum has long been called Maxillaria parviflora including in Flora of North America. Recent molecular studies have indicated that Maxillaria should be split into several genera, so many species including this one have been renamed.

References

External links
US Department of Agriculture plant profile, Maxillaria parviflora (Poepp. & Endl.) Garay purple tiger orchid 
IOSPE orchid photos, Maxillaria parviflora (Poepp. & Endl.) Garay 1967, Photo by Ismael Nilton Vischi

Epiphytic orchids
Orchids of Florida
Orchids of Mexico
Orchids of Central America
Orchids of Belize
Orchids of South America
Flora of the Caribbean
Maxillariinae
Plants described in 1788
Flora without expected TNC conservation status